West Digital Television is an Australian digital television network jointly owned by Seven West Media and WIN Corporation. It broadcasts free-to-air on a number of digital terrestrial transmitters in regional and remote areas of Western Australia, as well as free-to-view on the Viewer Access Satellite Television service. The network began as an affiliate of Network 10, remaining so until 1 July 2016, when it switched to the Nine Network.  On 1 July 2021, it returned to Network 10, broadcasting a direct feed of NEW-10 Perth.

The network is similar to other joint ventures already available in Tasmania, Mildura, Darwin and Central and Eastern Australia. As GWN7 consists of three different stations licensed in Albany/Bunbury, Kalgoorlie and Geraldton, and a fourth licensed to the rest of the state as part of the Remote Commercial Television Licence scheme, West Digital Television's network is made up of four separate stations. Each of the four stations trade as West Digital Television Pty Ltd.

History
On 18 June 2009, the Australian Communications & Media Authority allocated new "Section 38B" television broadcasting licences to a joint venture company owned by Prime Media and WIN Television. The company, named West Digital Television, launched Ten West on Thursday 10 June 2010 as part of the initial introduction of digital commercial television in Kalgoorlie, Karratha, Mawson Trig and Mingenew.

West Digital Television launched on the Viewer Access Satellite Television platform in April 2011.

Multi-channels One and Eleven were launched to Regional WA viewers on 28 July 2011, the same day digital commercial television commenced in Bunbury.

Switch to Nine 
On 1 July 2016, WIN's Nine Network-affiliated stations switched to Network Ten, displacing WDT's affiliation and requiring the station to negotiate a switch to Nine Network. WDT failed to reach an affiliation deal with Nine in time for the switchover, with the co-owners stating that Nine had been actively rejecting offers. At this time, the channel temporarily suspended transmission, with programming replaced by a loop of scenic footage with the scrolling message "Programming on this channel in Regional Western Australia is currently unavailable." On the evening of 2 July 2016 at around 7:30 p.m. WST, WDT began to carry Nine programming, joining its federal election coverage already in progress.

Back to 10 
On 12 March 2021, Nine announced that it would return to WIN Television as its regional affiliate in most markets beginning 1 July 2021, in a deal that will last at least seven years. This will include WIN paying half of its regional advertising revenue to Nine Entertainment Co., and providing advertising time for Nine's properties on WIN's radio and television outlets. WIN will also provide advertising sales services for Nine's O&Os NBN and NTD (with the former succeeding a similar agreement it had with SCA). Nine CEO Hugh Marks explained that "while our relationship with Southern Cross and West digital television has been strong over the last five years, the opportunities presented by the WIN Network to both extend the reach of Nine's premium content into more regional markets under one agreement, and to work cooperatively with them on a national and local news operation, mean this is the right time for us to return to WIN".

In March 2021, 10 announced that it would return to Southern Cross Austereo as its regional affiliate in most markets beginning on 1 July 2021 in a deal that will last at least two years. This has ended WIN's five-year agreement with Network 10. Since Southern Cross Austereo does not have a television presence in Western Australia, 10 affiliated with WDT in the region from 1 July 2021.

Programming
The network rebroadcasts a direct feed of NEW-10 Perth, including programming and events produced in Perth. The network previously rebroadcast a direct feed of STW-9 Perth from 2016 to 2021. West Digital Television does not produce any local programming.

News
West Digital Television simulcasts the Perth edition of 10 News First from NEW-10 produced from both TEN-10 in Sydney and NEW-10 in Perth, alongside the 5pm weekend news from TEN-10 in Sydney. It previously simulcast the Perth edition of Nine News from STW-9, alongside the 5pm weekend news from TCN-9 in Sydney and 6pm weekend news from STW-9 in Perth.

Availability

The network's channels are available statewide in digital terrestrial and digital satellite format. Below is a table showing the logical channel numbers (LCN) for the full suite of digital services.

Terrestrial 
West Digital Television operates four television stations in regional and remote areas of Western Australia – SDW in the South West, VDW in the Goldfields, GDW in the Mid West and WDW for the remaining areas of the state. The stations are based on GWN7's separate licence areas and all broadcast free-to-air digital television channels 10, 10 Bold and 10 Peach. Terrestrial transmissions are available in many regional cities and towns, including Albany, Broome, Bunbury, Carnarvon, Geraldton, Kalgoorlie, Karratha, Merredin, as well as others.

Satellite 
The network is also broadcasts the same channels free-to-view on the Viewer Access Satellite Television service. The satellite service can be accessed by eligible viewers in the Western Australia TV3 licence area, which includes the entire state of WA, Christmas Island and Cocos/Keeling Islands.

References

Joint ventures
WIN Television
Prime Media Group
Seven Network
Digital terrestrial television in Australia
Television channels and stations established in 2010
2010 establishments in Australia